The Superprestige Gavere is a cyclo-cross race held in Gavere, Belgium, which is part of the Superprestige.

Past winners

References
 Men's results
 Women's results

Cyclo-cross races
Cycle races in Belgium
Recurring sporting events established in 1983
1983 establishments in Belgium
Cyclo-cross Superprestige
Gavere
Sport in East Flanders